Bäst i test (English: Best in Test) is a Swedish comedy programme based on the British show Taskmaster. It has been broadcast on SVT since spring 2017. The show features four fixed panelists per series, along with one guest per episode, who all compete in odd competitions, judged by Babben Larsson and assisted by David Sundin.

The show is based in the Filmhuset studio where the interview with the panelists takes place, together with the show's final. Most of the competitions are done in and around Villa Frescati in Stockholm.

Seasons
The first season had four episodes. Regular panellists were Bianca Kronlöf, Kodjo Akolor, Claes Malmberg and Pia Johansson. Guests were Marko Lehtosalo, Parisa Amiri and Eva Röse.

The second season with eight episodes was shown during the spring of 2018. Guests were Ann Westin, Al Pitcher, Claes Malmberg, Emma Knyckare, Clara Henry and Thomas Petersson.

The third season with seven episodes aired in 2019 with the permanent contestants Anders Jansson, Annika Andersson, Nassim al Fakir, and Clara Henry. The guest contestants were Kristina "Keyyo" Petrushina, Marika Carlsson, Måns Nathanaelson, Per Andersson (actor), Fab Freddie, Emma Molin and Oscar Zia.

Like every season, they have guest panelists. Guests for this season were Jesper Rönndahl, Christine Meltzer, Anis Don Demina, Kristina "Keyyo" Petrushina, Fredrik Lindström, Niklas Andersson, Pernilla Wahlgren, David Batra and Nour El Refai. This season changed filming location.

The sixth season aired in 2022 with nine episodes.

Episodes

Season 1 (2017)
The permanent panelists of the season were Bianca Kronlöf (season winner), Kodjo Akolor, Claes Malmberg and Pia Johansson.

Season 2 (2018)
The permanent panelists of the season were Ola Forssmed, Marika Carlsson, Erik Ekstrand (season winner) and Ellen Bergström.

Season 3 (2019)
The permanent panelists of the season were Anders Jansson, Annika Andersson, Nassim al Fakir and Clara Henry (season winner).

Season 4 (2020)
The permanent panelists of the season were Anders Johansson, Carin da Silva, Kristoffer Appelquist and Kristina Petrushina. The guest contestants accumulated more points than any of the panelists and were declared winners of the season.

Season 5 (2021)
The permanent panelists of the season were Johanna Nordström, Olof Wretling (season winner), Morgan Alling and Arantxa Alvarez.

Season 6 (2022)
The permanent panelists of the season were Anis Don Demina, Sofia Dalén, Sussie Eriksson and Marcus Berggren. As in season 4, the guest contestants accumulated more points than any of the panelists and were declared winners of the season.

Reviews and awards 
The show has received a negative review by Sylvia Balac from Aftonbladet, calling the show "nonsense" and ending with "Come on, SVT! You should be able to do better than this." Karolina Fjellborg, also from Aftonbladet, gave a slightly more positive review saying that she has "seen worse", but still criticising that it is "another show based on nonsense and air only". Malin Slotte from Hufvudstadsbladet gave also a negative review saying that "SVT have unbuttoned their pants, laid down on the couch, and greatly lowered their ambition".

References

External links 
 Bäst i Test on SVT Play 
 

2017 Swedish television series debuts
2010s game shows
2020s game shows
2020s Swedish television series
Sveriges Television original programming
Swedish game shows
Swedish comedy television series
Taskmaster (TV series)
Swedish-language television shows
Swedish television series based on British television series